David Bolarinwa (born 20 October 1993) is a British sprinter.

Sporting career 
At the inaugural 2010 Summer Youth Olympics in Singapore, Bolarinwa won a bronze medal at the 100 metres, behind Odean Skeen and Masaki Nashimoto. He had entered the race as the favourite, since he ran a world leading 10.39 sec just two weeks earlier, and was the fastest in the qualifying heats. Competing for Woolwich Polytechnic School, Bolarinwa won 100 m at the 2010 UK School Games, breaking his own school games record to finish in 10.81 seconds. Bolarinwa's personal best of 10.39 sec is the second-fastest by an under-17 year old ("Youth") in the UK, second only to Mark Lewis-Francis' 10.31 sec in 1999. His twin brother Daniel is a semi-professional footballer, who played for Staines Town F.C., Hitchin Town F.C. and Welling United F.C.

References

External links

1993 births
Living people
British male sprinters
Black British sportsmen
Athletes (track and field) at the 2010 Summer Youth Olympics